The Agreement on the Political Parameters and Guiding Principles for the Settlement of the India-China Boundary Question is an agreement between the India and China signed on 11 April 2005. The agreement is a direct outcome of the Special Representative (SR) mechanism that had been set up through a 2003 agreement.

Background 
The 1993, 1996 and 2005 agreements deal with military confidence building measures. However these agreements did not sufficiently cover the political aspect of the boundary settlement. Accordingly in a 2003 agreement, "Declaration on Principles for Relations and Comprehensive Cooperation", the Special Representative mechanism had been set up. The SRs would "explore from the political perspective of the overall bilateral relationship the framework of a boundary settlement." The first five meetings of the SRs resulted in the signing of the 2005 agreement.

Summary 

 The resolution and final solution of the boundary question will promote positive relations between India and China, "in accordance with the Five Principles of Peaceful Coexistence" and "principle of mutual and equal security".
 In attainment of the solution the two sides will consider "historical evidence, national sentiments, practical difficulties and reasonable concerns and sensitivities of both sides, and the actual state of border areas"; the boundary should be along "well-defined geographical features"; interests of "settled populations in the border areas" to be considered; and "delineation of the boundary to be done through modern and joint means.
 Pending final solution, all dispute resolution mechanism bodies will continue to function as per their objectives.

Impact 
Article 3 of the agreement mentions "package settlement". A version of this had been put on the table informally by China as early as 1981; a package settlement as opposed to a sector by sector deal. The 2005 agreement had a direct effect on the claims aired in the package settlement. 

Article VII, that "the two sides shall safeguard due interests of their settled populations in the border areas", resulted in China pushing the development of such "settled populations".

See also 

 India China border agreements
 1988: India-China Joint Working Group on the boundary question
 Confidence building measures
 1993: Border Peace and Tranquility Agreement
 1996: Agreement on Military Confidence Building Measures
 2005: Protocol for the Implementation of Military Confidence Building Measures
 Political measures
 2003: Declaration on Principles for Relations and Comprehensive Cooperation
 2005: Agreement on the Political Parameters and Guiding Principles for the Settlement of the India-China Boundary Question
 2012: Agreement on the Establishment of a Working Mechanism for Consultation and Coordination on India-China Border Affairs
 2013: Border Defence Cooperation Agreement
 2020: 5 point statement

References

Bibliography

 

China–India relations
China–India border
Territorial disputes of India
Territorial disputes of China